Tone Set was a synth-pop duo formed by musicians Galen Herod and Greg Horn in 1981 from Tempe, Arizona, who first met each other by working at the local station KAET. The duo's early sound was very minimalist in style, as evident by their instrumental 1982 debut Cal's Ranch. Later on, their music became increasingly pop-oriented, as shown by their follow-up Calibrate, which was released by self-released in February 1983 through their own Pegna Records imprint.

Although the band received local radio airplay, as well as having the music video for the track "Life Is Busy" played on MTV and Cinemax, the band met little to no fanfare. Tone Set would eventually cease to exist later in 1983, with both members going on to work on other projects. Galen Herod began a solo career and started the band Galen Herod and the Skin People. The duo would eventually work together again in the band Dumb But Happy, but they too broke up.

During their existence, Tone Set performed shows under names such as Life Is Busy, The Art Farmers, and The Special Eds. They also contributed the track "Out! Out!" to the Placebo Records compilation Amuck under the name Happy People. The group utilized synthesizers and electronic drum kits for their music, and audio samples taken from films and radio ads were used frequently as well.

In 2016, Vinyl On Demand issued a four-disc discography vinyl boxset titled Such Heavy Conviction: Recordings 1981-1983 that included every single recording made by the duo, including unreleased material.

Discography
Cal's Ranch (1982, Zia Records)
Calibrate (1983, Pegna Records)
Such Heavy Conviction: Recordings 1981-1983 (2016, Vinyl On Demand)

References

External links
Tone Set on Discogs
Tone Set Biography on Synthpunk.org Fan Site

Musical groups established in 1981
Musical groups disestablished in 1983
American musical duos
Musical groups from Tempe, Arizona
Electronic music duos
American synth-pop groups